Hermitian wavelets are a family of continuous wavelets, used in the continuous wavelet transform. The  Hermitian wavelet is defined as the  derivative of a Gaussian distribution:

where  denotes the  Hermite polynomial.

The normalisation coefficient  is given by:

The prefactor  in the resolution of the identity of the continuous wavelet transform for this wavelet is given by:

i.e. Hermitian wavelets are admissible for all positive .

In computer vision and image processing, Gaussian derivative operators of different orders are frequently used as a basis for expressing various types of visual operations; see scale space and N-jet.

Examples of Hermitian wavelets:
Starting from Gaussian function with :

the first 3 derivatives read as, 

and their  norms 

So the wavelets which are the negative normalized derivatives are:

See also 
 Wavelet

External links 
 Hermitian Clifford–Hermite Wavelets (Department of Mathematical Analysis, Faculty of Engineering, Ghent University)

Continuous wavelets